The Wega 180 is a Brazilian amateur-built aircraft designed and produced by Wega Aircraft of Palhoça, Santa Catarina, introduced at the Sun 'n Fun airshow in 2013. The aircraft is supplied as a kit for amateur construction or as a complete ready-to-fly-aircraft.

Design and development
The aircraft features a cantilever low-wing, a two-seats-in-side-by-side configuration enclosed cockpit under a bubble canopy, retractable tricycle landing gear and a single engine in tractor configuration.

The aircraft is made from carbon fibre. Its  span wing employs an NFL (1)-0215F airfoil at the wing root transitioning to a Wortmann FX-62-K-131 at the wing tip. The wing is a separate structure and is attached to the fuselage with four bolts. The standard engines used are the  Superior XP-360 and the  Lycoming IO-360  four-stroke powerplants.

Operational history
Reviewers Roy Beisswenger and Marino Boric described the design in a 2015 review as "a modern, two-place, high-performance aircraft...[with] aerobatic features and claims a high 300 km/h (190-knot) cruise speed in a comfortable, ergonomic cabin...the aircraft's clean design, together with the retractable gear, helps Wega to reach a max airspeed of 350 km/h".

Specifications (Wega 180)

See also
List of aerobatic aircraft

References

External links

180
2010s Brazilian sport aircraft
Aircraft first flown in 2013
Single-engined tractor aircraft
Low-wing aircraft
Homebuilt aircraft
Aerobatic aircraft